Duttaphrynus stomaticus, also known as the Indian marbled toad, Punjab toad, Indus Valley toad, or marbled toad, is a species of toad found in Asia from eastern Iran, Pakistan, Afghanistan to Nepal, extending into Peninsular India and Bangladesh.

This toad lacks cranial crests and the space between the eyes is broader than the upper eyelid. The tympanum of the ear is two-thirds the diameter of the eye. The first and second fingers are nearly equal and there is a single sub-articular tubercle. A spiny ridge is found on the tarsus. There is a tibial gland and the parotoid is longer than broad. Three dark bands run transversely on the forearm. The underside is whitish with dark mottling on the throat.

They are nocturnal, so during the day, they hide from predators under rocks or fallen leaves. This species is also known to be monsoon breeders and lay their eggs in small ponds during rainy season.

References

External links
 AmphibiaWeb

stomaticus
Amphibians of Afghanistan
Amphibians of Bangladesh
Frogs of India
Amphibians of Iran
Amphibians of Nepal
Amphibians of Pakistan
Amphibians described in 1864
Taxa named by Christian Frederik Lütken